is a Japanese fencer who participated in the women's sabre individual fencing event at the 2016 Summer Olympics.

Achievements 
Ranking at the World Cup

References

External links 
 
 
 
 
 

1990 births
Living people
Japanese female sabre fencers
Fencers at the 2016 Summer Olympics
Olympic fencers of Japan
Fencers at the 2018 Asian Games
Asian Games bronze medalists for Japan
Asian Games medalists in fencing
Medalists at the 2018 Asian Games
Fencers at the 2020 Summer Olympics
21st-century Japanese women